In politics, a party secretary is a senior official within a political party with responsibility for the organizational and daily political work. In most parties, the party secretary is second in rank to the party leader (or party chairman). In some parties, especially the communist parties, the General Secretary is the leader.

Party secretary positions
  Chinese Communist Party Committee Secretary
  Korean Workers' Party Committee Secretary
  Vietnamese Communist Party Committee Secretary
  Lao People's Revolutionary Party Committee Secretary
  Cuban Communist Party Committee Secretary
  Soviet Communist Party Committee Secretary

Organizational structure of political parties